One third of Wakefield Metropolitan District Council in West Yorkshire, England is elected each year for 3 years, followed by one year without an election. 63 councillors are elected with 3 from each of the 21 wards.

Political control
From 1889 until 1974 Wakefield was a county borough, independent from any county council. Under the Local Government Act 1972 it had its territory enlarged and became a metropolitan borough, with West Yorkshire County Council providing county-level services. The first election to the reconstituted city council was held in 1973, initially operating as a shadow authority before coming into its revised powers on 1 April 1974. West Yorkshire County Council was abolished in 1986 and Wakefield became a unitary authority. Political control of the council since 1973 has been held by the following parties:

Leadership
The leaders of the council since 1998 have been:

Council elections
1998 Wakefield Metropolitan District Council election
1999 Wakefield Metropolitan District Council election
2000 Wakefield Metropolitan District Council election
2002 Wakefield Metropolitan District Council election
2003 Wakefield Metropolitan District Council election
2004 Wakefield Metropolitan District Council election (whole council elected after boundary changes)
2006 Wakefield Metropolitan District Council election
2007 Wakefield Metropolitan District Council election
2008 Wakefield Metropolitan District Council election
2010 Wakefield Metropolitan District Council election
2011 Wakefield Metropolitan District Council election
2012 Wakefield Metropolitan District Council election
2014 Wakefield Metropolitan District Council election
2015 Wakefield Metropolitan District Council election
2016 Wakefield Metropolitan District Council election
2018 Wakefield Metropolitan District Council election
2019 Wakefield Metropolitan District Council election
2021 Wakefield Metropolitan District Council election
2022 Wakefield Metropolitan District Council election

Borough result maps

By-election results

1993-2001

2001-2009

2009-2017

References

 By-election results

External links
Wakefield Metropolitan District Council

 
Local government in Wakefield
Council elections in West Yorkshire
Elections in Wakefield
Metropolitan borough council elections in England